Philodromus laricium is a spider species found in Spain, France, Italy, Switzerland and Austria.

See also 
 List of Philodromidae species

References

External links 

laricium
Spiders of Europe
Spiders described in 1875